Before the Fire is a 2020 American thriller drama film directed by Charlie Buhler. The film follows a Hollywood actress whose rising career is cut short when an influenza pandemic sends her back to the small town she fled years before. She soon finds something more dangerous than any virus waiting for her.

Before the Fire received acclaim as a frightening and timely look at how individual lives are turned upside down by a global crisis. The feature had its world premiere at the Cinequest Film Festival in March 2020.

Cast 
 Jenna Lyng Adams as Ava Boone (Amanda)
 Ryan Vigilant as Max Rhodes
 Jackson Davis as Kelly Rhodes
 Charles Hubbell as Jasper Boone
 Dakota Morrissiey as Jake
 MJ Karmi as Betsy Rhodes

Production 

Principal photography for Before the Fire began in February in South Dakota. The crew shot 11 days on two family farms near the small towns of Delmont and Letcher, South Dakota. Once they wrapped the winter, the whole team took a few months off to regroup, and returned in July to film in the intense South Dakota summer.

Director Charlie Buhler said in an interview, "We fought to make this movie because we felt that there was a very specific expectation about the types of stories women were able to tell. Jenna and I both love action and sci-fi, so we wanted to make a female protagonist that we women could really rally behind." Jenna Lyng Adams, added, "Growing up in Minnesota, I've always been drawn to stories about remote communities and places. The rural Midwest is already isolated in ways, but a global emergency could push it even more so. I wanted to make a story about a woman reinventing herself over and over again to survive."

Release 
The film premiered at the 2020 Cinequest Film Festival. It also screened at the 2020 Manchester International Film Festival. Its festival run soon came to a halt due to the COVID-19 pandemic. The film garnered attention due to its striking similarity to the pandemic.

Reception 
Liz Whittemore of the Alliance of Female Film Journalists said the film "is about trauma, family dynamics, fear, betrayal, and power. It will pull you in from the very first moments and not let up until the credits." Dark Sky Films' Nicola Goelzhaeuser said, "Before the Fire arrives as the world is caught in an existential crisis, but it is really a timeless achievement that reveals how far people will go to survive."

References

External links 
 
 

2020 films
2020 independent films
2020 thriller drama films
American thriller drama films
American independent films
Films set in South Dakota
Films about viral outbreaks
2020s English-language films
2020s American films